Kambaata may refer to:
the Kambaata people
the Kambaata language